Visa requirements for Sierra Leonean citizens are administrative entry restrictions by the authorities of other states placed on citizens of Sierra Leone. As of 2 July 2019, Sierra Leonean citizens had visa-free or visa on arrival access to 62 countries and territories, ranking the Sierra Leonean passport 82nd in terms of travel freedom (tied with passports from Kyrgyzstan and Mongolia) according to the Henley Passport Index.

Visa requirements map

Visa requirements

Dependent, Disputed, or Restricted territories
Unrecognized or partially recognized countries

Dependent and autonomous territories

See also

Visa policy of Sierra Leone
Sierra Leonean passport

References and Notes
References

Notes

Sierra Leone
Foreign relations of Sierra Leone